Anita Marshall is an American geoscience education researcher and disability activist. She is known for her research on and personal experience with disability in geology.

Education and career 
Marshall received her PhD in geology from the University of South Florida. She is a geology lecturer at the University of Florida.

Research and activism 
Marshall is recognized by the US Business Leadership Network and others as a leader in disability inclusion in STEM. Research has shown that most geoscientists think that physical ability is necessary for a successful career in geology, and disabled people are severely underrepresented in geology. Marshall works to counteract this with her scholarship and activism. She told PBS NewsHour, "If you think about it, the moon is also inaccessible. Mars is inaccessible. And yet we do science on them anyway."

Marshall is the Director of Operations for the International Association for Geoscience Diversity, an American non-profit organization focused on geoscience and disability. She is part of the research team on an NSF-funded project that seeks to enable students with limited mobility to participate in geology field work. The research team uses technology and collaborative teamwork to allow for full participation.

Marshall is a member of the Choctaw Nation and advocates for increased diversity in STEM across multiple types of identities. As a disabled indigenous woman in geoscience, she represents several groups that are underrepresented in STEM fields.

Awards 
 Rising Leader for students with disabilities, DisabilityIN, 2017

References 

Living people
Year of birth missing (living people)
Scientists with disabilities
University of South Florida alumni
University of Florida faculty
American people with disabilities
21st-century American women scientists
American women academics
Choctaw Nation of Oklahoma people
21st-century Native Americans
21st-century Native American women
Native American women scientists